Michael (John) Hurd was the Dean of Nelson from 1981  until 1993.

He was born in 1944, educated at the University of Otago and ordained in 1968. After curacies in Anderson's Bay and Tauranga he was Vicar of Tapanui.

References

Deans of Nelson
1944 births
University of Otago alumni
Living people